Mom Rajawongse Thepkamol Devakula (Thai: หม่อมราชวงศ์เทพกมล เทวกุล); born (April 12, 1936) is the son of Prince Wongsanuwat Devakula and Princess Kamolpramoj Kitiyakara. Mom Rajawongse Thepkamol Devakula is a former Thai Ambassador to France and Burma, has served as Permanent Secretary of the Ministry of Foreign Affairs, and was a member of the Senate.

After a distinguished career in the foreign service, Mom Rajawongse Thepkamol Devakula was appointed to the Privy Council of the King of Thailand, Bhumibol Adulyadej on August 7, 1997. Mom Rajawongse Thepkamol Devakula and his wife, Khunying Kwanta Devakula, have three daughters, ML Abhawadee Trai-Ukos, ML Kwankamol Thongyai and ML Radeethep Devakula

Representing the Royal family at functions
The councilors carry out other duties within the Bureau of the Royal Household and Royal Project Foundation. Under royal command, councilors attend official functions and carry out official duties on behalf of the king or the Royal Family of Thailand.

Mom Rajawongse Thepkamol Devakula is often seen in diplomatic circles such as the French ambassador Thierry Viteau, the Singaporean Ambassador Chua Siew San, Bahrain's Ambassador to Thailand Adel Yusuf Satir, His Majesty King Hamad of Bahrain, his Royal Highness Premier's Advisor for Economic Affairs Abdulla Hassan Saif, Vietnams's Ambassador Nguyen Duy Hung, and Sweden's Ambassador Lennart Linnér.

References

1936 births
Living people
Thepkamol Devakula
Thepkamol Devakula
Thepkamol Devakula
Thepkamol Devakula
Thepkamol Devakula
Thepkamol Devakula
Thepkamol Devakula